Howard Moskowitz is an American market researcher and psychophysicist. He is known for the detailed study he made of the types of spaghetti sauce and horizontal segmentation. By providing a large number of options for consumers, Moskowitz pioneered the idea of intermarket variability as applied to the food industry.

Products
Moskowitz developed Cherry Vanilla Dr Pepper when he was hired in 2004 by Cadbury Schweppes, which was hoping to expand the market for Dr. Pepper by developing a product line extension using an alternative formulation with vanilla or cherry flavors. Moskowitz has been consulted by Campbell Soup, General Foods, Kraft and PepsiCo for his expertise in food optimization. According to Moskowitz he has optimized soups, pizzas, salad dressings, and pickles in his work for various firms. His research on Prego spaghetti sauce, which revealed a significant customer preference for an "extra-chunky" formulation, is notable as was his optimization of the amount of salt, sugar, and fat in spaghetti sauce at the "bliss point" which maximized consumer satisfaction. His first job after graduation from Harvard was for the United States Army with respect to Meals, Ready-to-Eat, where he applied the concept of sensory-specific satiety, the tendency for consumers to tire of strongly flavored foods, to ensure that the meals were formulated in a way that encouraged soldiers to eat sufficient calories.

References

External links
 TED Talk about Howard Moskowitz by Malcolm Gladwell, February 2004
 

American marketing people
Living people
Marketing people
Market researchers
American food scientists
Harvard University alumni
Queens College, City University of New York alumni
American chief executives of food industry companies
Year of birth missing (living people)